Hemidactylus farasani, the Farasan gecko, is a species of house gecko from Saudi Arabia.

References

Hemidactylus
Reptiles of the Arabian Peninsula
Reptiles described in 2022